Tourism in Zambia relates to tourism in the African nation Zambia. The tourism industry is a major and growing industry in Zambia. Zambia has more than 2500 lions along with several National parks, waterfalls, lakes, rivers, and historic monuments. Zambia has been involved in several agreements on tourism with nations like Uganda and Kenya. Uganda Ministry of Tourism and Arts said Zambia is a model in tourism in Africa. Zambia Tourism Agency (ZTA) has partnered with the Government through the Ministry of Tourism and private sector to enhance the marketing aspect in the tourism industry.

Overview 
Zambia's tourism industry is one of the country's growth potential areas. It has been given the non-traditional export status and is receiving a lot of support from the Government by way of infrastructure development, promotion of increased private sector participation, as well as attractive tax incentives for all investments in the sector.

Hunting is also an important part of the Zambian tourist industry. Though the country banned all hunting in January 2013 amid concerns of corruption and over hunting of certain species, it legalized hunting again for most species of plains game in 2014. Additionally, the Zambian Tourism Minister announced that leopards may be legally hunted starting in 2015 and lions may be hunted again beginning in 2016.

Tourist Attractions

Governmental Policies Regarding Tourism 
Due to Zambia's poor economic status, the country has historically relied on foreign aid in an attempt to alleviate poverty. Tourism has emerged in recent years as an alternate method to mining to boost Zambia's economy.

Tourism is being seen by Zambia's government as a tool for economic and rural development, as it generates income, creates jobs, promotes wildlife conservation, and improves standards of living.

The increasingly popular worldwide phenomena adventure tourism has also risen in popularity within Zambia, especially within the city of Livingstone, which is now becoming known as Africa's "adventure tourism capital".

Since tourism as an economic sector is boosted with cooperation between neighboring countries, Zambia, as a member of the South African Development Community (SADC), has cooperated with other countries within the SADC in order to mutually attract tourists.

Zambia, along with fellow SADC nations, have struggled to compete with other nations with more established tourist destinations, for a variety of reasons, some of which include difficulty in transportation to the countries, an absence of direct international flights, and failure to create attractive tourist experiences or products.

Efforts to Promote Tourism 
As a member of the SADC,Zambia engaged in the following efforts to promote tourism.

SADC Tourism Protocol 1998 - Member countries are urged to create a "Univisa" that would allow tourists to travel across the borders of SADC countries freely. After initial success, in November 2014, Zambia and Zimbabwe signed a memorandum of understanding to put into effect a more permanent UNIVISA which allows tourists to visit both countries with a single visa.

Regional Tourism Organization of South Africa (RETOSA) 2002 - In an attempt to make the SADC more appealing to visitors, the charter imposed upon member states of SADC a series of protocols and programs to promote the region.

Zambia is currently struggling to facilitate tourism without creating a burden on local communities that would result in a loss of culture, an unstable economy, and compromised environment.

Tourism as a form of wildlife conservation 
An increase in sport hunting and ecotourism has resulted in an increase in wildlife populations in South African countries such as Zambia. Since Zambia is home to so many national parks, waterfalls, and game management areas, most of Zambia's tourism is dependent on wildlife. Ecotourism within Zambia, while devastated by the Covid-19 pandemic, has played a major role in controlling poaching and bringing in foreign investment for wildlife protection.

One U.N. Development Programme, the Lion's Share, announced recently its commitment to grant $400,000 towards wildlife-based tourism in Zambia, in order to protect wildlife and generate jobs. Not only is wildlife essential to the development of Zambia's Tourism industry and thus Zambia's economy, but tourism is also essential to the preservation of wildlife in Zambia. The Minister of Tourism and Arts of Zambia stands by the framework defined in expectations and goals set out in the Agenda 2030, an initiative to increase tourism sustainability in Africa.

However, tourism has also been linked to an increase in urbanization within Zambia, at the detriment of the environmentalism efforts. Another challenge of tourism is documented instances of the Dengue Virus being spread throughout the region from other neighboring countries.

Gallery

Visa Regulations 
As of 1 October 2022, visa requirements were waived for tourists holding a passport from the following countries and territories:

Arrivals by country

See also 

 Economy of Zambia: Tourism

References

 
Zambia